Petrópolis, also known as The Imperial City, is a municipality in the Southeast Region of Brazil. According to the 2010 National Brazilian Census, Petrópolis municipality had 295,917 inhabitants that year, up from 286,537 inhabitants at the last census. Besides being the largest and most populous city in the Fluminense Mountain Region, the city also has the largest GDP and HDI in the region.

The town's name ("city of Peter") honors Pedro II, the last Emperor of Brazil, who is entombed there at the Cathedral of Saint Peter of Alcantara. The city was the summer residence of the Brazilian Emperors and aristocrats in the 19th century, and was the official capital of the state of Rio de Janeiro during the First Brazilian Republic, between 1894 and 1902.

There are projects to annex Petrópolis again to the Metropolitan Region of Rio de Janeiro, because it is linked to the capital by political and economic ties, and contains one of the state's highest HDIs.

History

Colonial period

Until the 18th century, the region was inhabited by the índios coroados (crowned Indians), which earned it the Portuguese name of "Sertão dos Índios Coroados". It was only with the discovery of gold in Minas Gerais and the consequent opening of the new way of the mines that passed through Petrópolis in that century that the region began to be occupied by non-Indians. The town's origins can be traced to Bernardo Soares de Proença, who between 1722 and 1725 opened an alternative route between Rio de Janeiro and Minas Gerais, across the Serra da Estrela called "Caminho Novo das Minas" (New Road to Mines).

Imperial period

While traveling to Minas Gerais along this route in 1822, Emperor Pedro I stayed at a farm owned by a Catholic priest, named Correia, and found the region's climate pleasant. As the priest's sister and heiress refused to sell his property, the Emperor bought the neighboring one, called, the Córrego Seco Farm, in 1830. He had his summer palace built there, but never saw it finished, because he stepped down from the throne, on April 7, 1831. Other Brazilian aristocrats eventually followed suit.

His son, Emperor Pedro II, on March 16, 1843, signed an imperial decree ordering the construction of a settlement (to be formed with the arrival of German immigrants) and the construction of the dreamy summer palace on his outlying lands, the cornerstone of which was settled by the Emperor in May 1845, and that was ready in 1847. Conceived by Major Julius Friedrich Koeler, it is considered to be the second planned city in Brazil (after Recife, designed during the Dutch period), being composed of an urban nucleus – the city (now the center), where the Imperial Palace, Public buildings, commerce and services.

From then on, the city became the de facto capital of the Empire of Brazil during the summer, with the whole court moving. Large numbers of well to do inhabitants of the city of Rio de Janeiro also spent the summer to Petrópolis to escape the outbreaks of yellow fever. Emperor Pedro II ruled for 49 years, and remained in Petrópolis over at least forty summers, for up to five months. On 29 September 1857, the town was elevated to the status of a city. In 1861, the first Macadamized Highway in Brazil, Estrada União e Indústria, was inaugurated, connecting the city to the city of Juiz de Fora in Minas Gerais. In 1883, a railroad arrived at the city on the initiative of the Baron of Mauá. Also in 1877, the first telephone line in Brazil (and the first outside of the United States) was built, connecting Pedro's summer palace to his farm headquarters.

Regardless of the time of year, foreign diplomatic representatives lived in Petrópolis for most of the imperial period.

Republican period

Even after the establishment of the Republic and the exile of the Imperial family in 1889, the city continued to play a significant role in Brazilian history. It was a frequent choice as a summer residence for Presidents of the republic, who lodged at the Palácio Rio Negro (Black River Palace). The most frequent of them was Getúlio Vargas, whose stays, during Estado Novo, lasted up to three months.

Between 1894 and 1902, the city was capital of the State of Rio de Janeiro, replacing Niterói, due to the two Navy Revolts. Also in this period, was chosen Hermogênio Silva, the only Deputy Governor of Rio de Janeiro whose political base was in Petrópolis. In 1897, the first cinema session took place in the city, with cinematographer showing of the Lumière brothers' first films. In 1903, the Treaty of Petrópolis, which gave Brazil the Acre territory, was signed between Brazil and Bolivia, at the residence of the Baron of Rio Branco. The sanitarian Oswaldo Cruz was named its first mayor in 1916. In the premises of the Quitandinha Palace, the declaration of war of the American countries to the Axis Powers was signed during World War II (1939–1945).

During the Brazilian military government in 1970s, there was a center for torture, called the house of death.

In 1973 the remains of Isabel, Princess Imperial of Brazil (1846–1921) and her husband, the Count of Eu, were brought to be buried in the Imperial Mausoleum. The Princess received a funeral of Head of State with the presence of the most important leaders of the Republic and the Brazilian Imperial Family and was declared a public holiday.

On 15 February 2022, over 150 people were killed by floods in Petrópolis following intense rainfall that caused mudslides.

Geography

Nestled among the forested hills of the Serra dos Órgãos, in the valley of the Quitandinha and Piabanha rivers, Petrópolis is a popular winter holiday spot. Besides the climate and surroundings, the main attraction is the former Summer Palace of the last Brazilian Emperor, which is now the Imperial Museum, specializing in Imperial history and memorabilia.

Petrópolis is home to the National Laboratory for Scientific Computing, a research unit of the Ministry of Science and Technology of the Brazilian Federal Government. The municipality holds part of the Central Rio de Janeiro Atlantic Forest Mosaic of conservation units, created in 2006.
The  Petrópolis Municipal Nature Park is in the historical center of the city of Petrópolis. It is part of the Petrópolis Environmental Protection Area and the Atlantic Forest Biosphere Reserve. The municipality also contains the  Pedra do Elefante Natural Monument.

Climate
Petrópolis has a humid subtropical climate (Köppen climate classification: Cwa) caused by elevation with humid summers.

The municipality contains part of the  Tinguá Biological Reserve, a strictly protected Atlantic Forest conservation unit created in 1989.

The temperatures are mild.

Demography

Petrópolis experienced a strong population growth in the late nineteenth century, which remained less significant throughout the twentieth century, having its population began to stagnate and then to contract (even if in a mild way) around the beginning 2000. According to 2010 data, 52.3% (approximately 155 thousand people) of the population belong to the female sex and 48.7% (about 145 thousand people) to the male sex.

Religion
According to the 2012 census of IBGE, Petrópolis is composed by:

 Roman Catholic Apostolic – 56.98%
 Protestants – 26.72%
 Kardecist Spiritists – 4.25%
 No Religion (Including Atheists, and Agnostics) – 9.32%
 Others – 2.73%

Ethnic composition
According to the 2010 demographic census, Petrópolis was home to 186,642 White people (63.5%), 75,025 Mixed people (25.4%), 31,463 Black people (10.6%), 970 Asian people (0.4%) and 281 Amerindian people (0.1%).

The main peoples to participate in the ethnic/cultural formation of Petrópolis were the Germans and the Portuguese (mainly from the region of the Azores). Other ethnic groups like Italian, French, English and Lebanese also had expressive participation in the formation of the city.

City districts

Petrópolis is divided into five districts, which are subdivided into smaller neighborhoods. These districts are subdivided into neighborhoods and / or urban and rural locations.

Petrópolis
 Downtown
 North zone: Quissamã, Retiro, Jardim Salvador, Itamarati (parte), Atílio Marotti, Quarteirão Brasileiro, among others.
 South zone: Valparaíso, Quitandinha, Duques, Taquara, Parque São Vicente, Coronel Veiga, Castelânea, Siméria, Duas Pontes, Ponte Fones, Quarteirão Suíço, Quarteirão Italiano, Independência, São Sebastião, Saldanha Marinho, Alto Independência, Mauá, among others.
 West zone: Bingen, Mosela, Duarte da Silveira, Capela, Castrioto, Pedras Brancas, Vila Militar, Rócio, Bataillard, Moinho Preto, Fazenda Inglesa, Quarteirão Ingelhein, Quarteirão Nassau, among others.
 East Zone: Morin, Alto da Serra, 24 de Maio, Vila Felipe, Vila Real, Campinho, Chácara Flora, Sargento Boening, Oswero Vilaça, Meio da Serra, among others.

Districts
 Cascatinha – Araras, Vale das Videiras, Bonsucesso, Carangola, Vila Manzini, Castelo São Manoel, Corrêas, Bairro da Glória, Itamarati, Estrada da Saudade, Nogueira, Samambaia, Jardim Salvador, Roseiral, Alcobacinha and Humberto Rovigatti.
 Itaipava – Madame Machado, Mangalarga, Vila Rica, Jardim Americano, Vale do Cuiabá, Benfica, Laginha, Gentio, Catubira, Ribeirão, Castelo, Reta, Sumidouro, Santa Mônica, Arranha-Céu, Parque Santa Maria, Parque dos Eucaliptos, Estrada das Arcas and centro de Itaipava
 Pedro do Rio – Secretário, Fagundes, Taquaril, Barra Mansa, among others.
 Posse – Brejal, Rio Bonito, Tremedeira, Granjas Raposo, Nossa Senhora de Fátima, Jacuba among others.

Economy
Petrópolis' economy is based on tourism, services and industry. It is the 2nd largest beer production centre in the country and the headquarters of major Brazilian brewery companies such as Grupo Petrópolis (which owns the beer brands Itaipava, Crystal, Lokal, Black Princess and Petra) and Bohemia, and also has a Brasil Kirin Factory.

Other companies also have their headquarters in the city, such as the Mundo Verde network (Brazilian retailer of natural products) and the chocolate maker Katz. Currently the project is being developed for the Industrial District of Posse, which aims to encourage industries in the 5th district of the city. Petrópolis has the 9th largest GDP of the state of Rio de Janeiro, in front of cities such as Nova Friburgo and Teresópolis, and, in national scope, more than six state capitals, such as Aracaju, Palmas and Macapá.

The city's economy is still larger than entire states of the federation, such as Roraima and Acre.

Tourism

The high season of tourism in Petrópolis begins in July, with the beginning of Bauernfest, and the beginning of winter, which attracts tourists to the city by the cold weather. In 2014, some attractions increased more than 30%, compared to the same period of 2013, due to the FIFA World Cup Brazil 2014. 

It is the city of the mountain region of Rio de Janeiro that receives more tourists per year. Petrópolis was the non-capital that progressed most in the Competitiveness Index of the National Tourism in 2014, prepared by the Ministry of Tourism. According to the developers, the city is among the 15 best placed in Brazil in the overall ranking of competitiveness in tourism.

The main attractions of the city are:

 Açu Hill (Serra dos Órgãos National Park)
 Casa Stefan Zweig
 Castle of the Baron of Itaipava, (currently under reformation)
 Crystal Palace
 District of Itaipava, containing many popular attractions such as the "orto" market, vilareijo and the municipal park located in the heart of the district.
 Fatima's Throne
 Grão-Pará Palace
 House of Ipiranga (“House of the Seven Mistakes")
 House of Joaquim Nabuco
 House of Princess Isabel
 House of Rui Barbosa
 House (chalet) of Santos-Dumont
 House of the Baron and Viscount of Arinos
 House of the Baron and Viscount of Mauá
 House of the Viscount of Caeté
 Imperial Museum of Brazil
 Monastery of the Virgin
 Petrópolis City Park 
 Petrópolis Wax Museum
 Quitandinha Palace
 Rio Negro Palace
 Rural touristic tours of Taquaril, Brejal and Araras
 Saint Peter of Alcantara Cathedral (Cathedral of Petrópolis) with the Imperial Mausoleum
 Valparaíso (Gastronomic and Entertainment Center of Petrópolis)
 Bauernfest (Annual Festival in honor to the German immigrants)

Education

In the city, there are two public universities, the University of the State of Rio de Janeiro (UERJ), and the Fluminense Federal University (UFF), both of which have nationally recognized excellence levels, respectively, offering Architecture and Production Engineering courses. There is also in the city a unit of the Federal Center of Technological Education Celso Suckow of Fonseca (CEFET-RJ), with the courses of Degree in Physics, Bachelor in Tourism and Computer Engineering.

In addition to these, the city has the Catholic University of Petrópolis, the Petrópolis Medical School, Arthur Sá Earp Neto College, Estácio de Sá University, FAETERJ – Faculty of Technological Education of the State of Rio de Janeiro (Faculdade Estadual do Rio de Janeiro), which offers courses in Information Technology and Communication, and private higher education institutions that offer several undergraduate courses and also postgraduate courses (lato sensu and stricto sensu).

The municipality houses one of the teaching centers of the Distance Learning Center of the State of Rio de Janeiro, a consortium formed by public institutions of higher education in the state of Rio de Janeiro. This consortium offers free undergraduate courses in Pedagogy, Mathematics, Biology and Public Safety. The National Laboratory of Scientific Computing offers free masters and doctorate courses in the areas of Computation, Mathematics, Biology, Physics and Engineering.

In the field of basic education, the municipal education network reached the goal of the IDEB for 2011 and had its mark above the averages of the state and the country.

Transport

According to the IBGE census, in the year 2014 the total fleet of Petrópolis had 142,576 vehicles, approximately 1 vehicle for 2.1 inhabitants.

Of these were: 96,384 automobiles; 21,133 motorcycles; 8,048 pickup trucks; 6,753 vans; 3,092 heavy trucks; 2,769 scooters; 1,289 utilities; 926 buses; 680 micro-buses; 290 tractor-trucks; And 1,232 other types of vehicles. The public transport in the city is made by several companies, being the greater one, Petrolta.

The main public transport in Petrópolis is the bus along with taxis.

Culture

The culture of Petrópolis is directly linked to the imperial period of Brazil. Being nicknamed as Imperial City, the city has a large collection of theaters, museums, and palaces that refer to the period. In addition, much of the culture of the city was influenced by the immigration that participated in the formation of the identity of Petrópolis, where the German, Portuguese, Syrian, Lebanese and Italian groups stand out. Even today the city has the second largest festival of German culture in Brazil, the Bauernfest, only losing to the Oktoberfest in the south of the country. In addition, festivals are held every year that bring back the culture of other peoples, such as the Serra Serata, in honor of Italian immigration, and Bunka-Sai, a celebration of Japanese culture. The Cultural Foundation promotes every year (since 2009) the Maestro Guerra-Peixe de Cultura Prize, which honors the most outstanding artists and cultural agents during the year; The patron César Guerra-Peixe was an illustrious composer Petropolitan.

Architecture

The city has a unique architecture, such as the Palácio Quitandinha, the Petropolitan Academy of Letters, the House Museum of Santos Dumont, the Imperial Museum of Brazil, the Dom Pedro Theater, the Casa do Colono Museum and the Cathedral of Saint Peter of Alcantara. The palace is the main building of the so-called "historic center", where Koeler Avenue stands out, surrounded by mansions and palaces of the 19th century. The road is perpendicular to the facade of the Cathedral of Saint Peter of Alcantara and, in the other direction, the Ruy Barbosa Square and the facade of the Catholic University.

In the so-called "historic center", there are also buildings such as "Encantada" (summer house of Santos Dumont); The Crystal Palace; The Yellow Palace (City Council); The Rio Negro Palace, bordering the city hall (Sérgio Fadel Palace) and curious buildings, such as the "castelinho" of the self-proclaimed "Duke of Belfort", on the corner of Koeler and Ruy Barbosa Square, or the old house of the Rocha Miranda family, on Avenida Ipiranga – same address of another residence of the same family, in a sixties style. Modern lines are also present in the house of Lúcio Costa, in the neighborhood of Samambaia.

Theatres
Petrópolis has 2 theaters. The Teatro Dom Pedro, created in Art Deco style and inaugurated in 1933 by D'Angelo & Cia, is one of the largest in the state. The place was created with different styles, with mythological and futuristic references, making the theater considered an eclectic style, becoming a cultural and artistic reference for Petrópolis. The city also owns the Teatro Santa Cecília, built in 1955, located in Rua Aureliano Coutinho in the center of the city.

Museums

Petrópolis has great tradition as an imperial city. For this reason, today it owns one of the most important museums of history of Brazil, the Imperial Museum. Built between 1845 and 1862 as the summer Palace of the Imperial Family, it has a collection of pieces linked to the Brazilian monarchy, including furniture, documents, works of art and personal objects belonging to the Imperial Family. The Palace turned museum in 1943 by decree of the then president Getúlio Vargas. In addition, the city has the Petrópolis Wax Museum, Casa Santos Dumont Museum, Casa do Colono Museum, Princess Isabel House and Rio Negro Palace, all located in the city center.

With more than 321.000 visitors, the Imperial Museum in Petrópolis was the most visited museum in Brazil in 2016, according to data from the Brazilian Institute of Museums (Ibram) of the Ministry of Culture.

Festivals

The Petropolis culture is directly linked to German immigration. Since 1989, Bauernfest, a typical feast in honor of German immigrants, is held every year. The festival in 2012 lasted 11 days, had the participation of 368.000 visitors and raised R$55 million. The festival welcomes foreign tourists from all over Brazil, especially from the city of Rio de Janeiro. It is the most influential party of the city and includes competitions of chope the meter, presentations, typical cuisine, exhibition of chocolates, among other attractions.

The city also holds the Serra Serata, an annual festival that celebrates immigration and Italian culture.

Petrópolis also hosts the Winter Festival, promoted by SESC, with several attractions for this period of the year, which usually happens in the Quitandinha Palace. The festival is already traditional in the cities of Petrópolis, Nova Friburgo and Teresópolis. In 2014 was held the 13th edition, counting on concerts, theatrical presentations and cultural events.

The city also hosts Bunka-Sai, the annual festival of Japanese culture, which had its first edition in 2009. It has cultural presentations, in addition to the Japanese gastronomic festival.

Carnival
In 2013, the carnival of the city was canceled, for the application of the funds in the approximate amount of R$1 million, previously used in the parades, in the area of health, thus making Petrópolis a refuge of Cariocas of the Carnival. The decision was made during a meeting between the mayor and the Foundation for Culture and Tourism.

Sport
Serrano Football Club was founded on 29 June 1915 and was Garrincha's first professional team.

Media

The main television station transmitting news related to the city is InterTV Serra + Mar, as well as other local broadcasters such as SBT Rio and Band Rio, which present news from the mountain region of Rio de Janeiro, mainly related to Petrópolis and Nova Friburgo. The city also has local television networks with a certain influence: Rede Petrópolis de Televisão, TV Vila Imperial and TV Cidade de Petrópolis, with headquarters located in the center.

The main written newspaper of the city is the Tribuna de Petrópolis, one of the oldest in the country, created in 1909, published from Tuesday to Sunday, whose headquarters are in the center. Also worthy of note is the newspaper Diário de Petrópolis, published daily, of great influence in the city.

The main and most listened radio stations with headquarters in Petrópolis are Radio Tribuna FM (88.5 MHz), Radio UCP (106.3 MHz), Radio Supernova FM (98.7 MHz) and Radio Imperial (1550 AM). In addition, radio stations based in the city of Rio de Janeiro, such as the MIX FM Rio Radio, which already owned an exclusive domain of Radio MIX in Petrópolis, which was later purchased by Rádio UCP, are also very much heard.

In recent years, the internet has proved to be one of the main sources for news. In Petrópolis, the main ones are the G1 of the Serrana Region, the online portal of the Tribuna de Petrópolis, and the Diário de Petrópolis, besides the site Acontece in Petrópolis and the portal with live broadcast of TVC 16 (TV Cidade de Petrópolis). Also worth mentioning is the online portal of the RPT (Rede Petrópolis de Televisão).

Sister cities
Petrópolis is twinned with:

  Blumenau, Brazil

Notable people
 Dom Pedro de Alcântara, Prince of Grão-Pará
 Prince Luís of Orléans-Braganza
 Rafael da Silva, Olympique Lyonnais footballer
 Michel de Souza, operatic baritone, born in Petrópolis
 Guilherme Fontes, Brazilian Actor
 Edwin V. Morgan, United States Ambassador to Brazil 1912–1933
 Fiorella Mattheis, Brazilian Actress
 Peter Brian Medawar, Winner of the Nobel Prize in Physiology or Medicine, among other awards.
 Camila Morgado, Brazilian Actress
 Rodrigo Santoro, Actor who has appeared in many successful movies, including 300, What to Expect When You're Expecting, among others
 Magda Tagliaferro, Brazilian Pianist
 Stefan Zweig, Austrian author, lived in Petrópolis from 1940 until his suicide in the same city on February 23, 1942.
 Raphael Rabello, virtuoso Brazilian guitarist and composer.
 Elizabeth Bishop, American poet and short-story writer, lived partly in Petropolis for 17 years (1944–1961) with Lota de Macedo Soares, architect and landscape designer.
 Cristiane Brasil, Brazilian politician was born in Petrópolis
 Jorge Henrique Papf, a German-Brazilian photographer and painter

Petrópolis is also the home of Meninas Cantoras de Petrópolis, an all-girl singing group.

Gallery

References

External links

 Petrópolis City Hall 

 
1843 establishments in Brazil
Populated places established in 1843
German-Brazilian culture